Presidential elections were held in Cape Verde on 2 October 2016. Incumbent President Jorge Carlos Fonseca of the Movement for Democracy (MpD) was re-elected with 74% of the vote.

Electoral system
The President of Cape Verde is elected using the two-round system.

Candidates
Jorge Carlos Fonseca was looking to secure his second term and was the favourite to win as the main opposition party the African Party for the Independence of Cape Verde (PAICV) failed to present a candidate after their disappointing loss in the parliamentary elections in March and municipal elections in September. Fonseca, representing the MpD, faced two independent candidates, Joaquim Monteiro and Albertino Graça.

Campaign
Campaigning was temporarily suspended on 22 September following the death of the country's ex-president António Mascarenhas Monteiro. Monteiro was the country's first democratically elected president and was also a member of the MpD. All public events and rallies were suspended for 4 days until 26 September.

Results

Reactions
African Union – The 29 member AU observer team headed by Manuel Serifo Nhamadjo cited the election as an exemplary example of a transparent election.

References

Cape Verde
Presidential
Presidential elections in Cape Verde
Cape Verde